The Fantasy Stakes (Japanese ファンタジーステークス) is a Grade 3 horse race for two-year-old Thoroughbred fillies run in November over a distance of 1400 metres at Kyoto Racecourse.

The race was first run in 1996 and has held Grade 3 status ever since.

Winners since 2000

Earlier winners

 1996 - Shes Princess
 1997 - London Bridge
 1998 - Primo Ordine
 1999 - Tennessee Girl

See also
 Horse racing in Japan
 List of Japanese flat horse races

References

Turf races in Japan